Qingsheng railway station is a station in located in Qingsheng Village, Dongchong Town, Nansha District, Guangzhou. It is one of the stations on the Guangzhou–Shenzhen–Hong Kong Express Rail Link between Guangzhou South railway station in Panyu District, Guangzhou and Futian railway station in Futian District, Shenzhen.

Guangzhou Metro

An elevated metro station on Line 4 of the Guangzhou Metro started operation on 28 December 2017.

Services

China Railway
 Guangzhou–Shenzhen–Hong Kong Express Rail Link

Guangzhou Metro
 Line 4 (Guangzhou Metro)

References

Railway stations in Guangzhou
Guangzhou Metro stations in Nansha District
Railway stations in China opened in 2011